Konakalla Narayanarao Goud is a member of 15th Lok Sabha, the parliament of India. He belongs to Telugu Desam Party (TDP) and represents the Machilipatnam constituency of Krishna district in Andhra Pradesh.

References

India MPs 2009–2014
Telugu politicians
Lok Sabha members from Andhra Pradesh
Living people
Telugu Desam Party politicians
Year of birth missing (living people)
Place of birth missing (living people)
People from Krishna district